Bowie may refer to:

People
 Bowie (surname), origin of the surname and a list of people with the surname, including particularly:
 James Bowie ( 1796–1836), Texan revolutionary
 David Bowie (1947–2016),  English singer, songwriter, and actor
 Bowie Kuhn (1926–2007), fifth Commissioner of Major League Baseball

Places 
 Bowie, Arizona, an unincorporated community
 Bowie, Colorado, an unincorporated community
 Bowie, Maryland, a city
 Bowie County, Texas
 Bowie, Texas, a city in Montague County
 Fort Bowie, a 19th-century U.S. Army outpost in Arizona
 Bowie Seamount, a submarine volcano on the coast of British Columbia, Canada
 Bowie hotspot, a volcanic hotspot in the Pacific Ocean
 Bowie Canyon, a submarine canyon in the Bering Sea
 Bowie Crevasse Field, Ellsworth Mountains, Antarctica

Entertainment 
Bowie (Shining Force II), the default name of the protagonist in the Shining Force II video game
"Bowie" (Flight of the Conchords), the sixth episode of the television series Flight of the Conchords
Bowie: A Biography, a biography of David Bowie by Marc Spitz
Bowie – The Video Collection, a video album by David Bowie

Ships 
 USC&GS Bowie (CSS 27), a United States Coast and Geodetic Survey coastal survey ship in commission from 1946 to 1967
 , a United States Navy attack transport in commission from 1944 to 1946

Other uses
 Bowie knife, popularized by Jim Bowie
 Bowie State University, north of Bowie, Maryland
 Bowie Race Track, Bowie, Maryland
 Bowie High School (disambiguation), a list of high schools named Bowie

See also 
 Boøwy or Boowy, a Japanese rock band
 Bowi, an album by Nick Lowe, named after David Bowie
 Buie (disambiguation)
 Dowie, a surname
 Cowie (disambiguation)